BigDL is a distributed deep learning framework for Apache Spark, created by Jason Dai at Intel. BigDL has its source code hosted on GitHub.

Features

Applications

See also
 Comparison of deep learning software

References

Data mining and machine learning software
Free science software
Free statistical software